The Arlecchino is an award that is awarded annually in the form of a bronze statue by a jury of the Dutch Association of Theater and Concert Hall Directors (VSCD) as a prize for the most impressive male supporting actor role of the Dutch theater season. The prize bears the Italian name of the character Harlequin, and was first awarded in 1964. The figurine has been designed by  since 2005.

It is the pendant of the Colombina, the annual prize for best Dutch actress in a supporting role, named after the maid Columbina from the commedia dell'arte.

Winners

Past winners were:
 1964: Wim van den Brink
 1965: André van den Heuvel
 1966: Ton van Duinhoven
 1967: Luc Lutz
 1968: Peter van der Linden
 1969: Sacco van der Made
 1970: Frans van der Lingen
 1971: Lou Landré
 1972: Piet Römer
 1973: Wim Kouwenhoven
 1974: Edmond Classen
 1975: Eric van Ingen
 1976: Gijsbert Tersteeg
 1977: Henk Rigters
 1978: Frans Vorstman
 1979: Willem Wagter
 1980: Siem Vroom
 1981: Henk Votel
 1982: Wim van Rooij
 1983: Eric van Ingen
 1984: Titus Muizelaar
 1985: Edwin de Vries
 1986: Gijs Scholten van Aschat
 1987: Porgy Franssen
 1988: Theo Pont
 1989: Kees Hulst
 1990: Vic De Wachter
 1991: Victor Löw
 1992: Kees Coolen
 1993: Rik Launspach
 1994: Khaldoun El Mecky
 1995: Han Kerckhoffs
 1996: Henk Votèl
 1997: Patrick Deleu
 1998: Lucas Van den Eynde
 1999: Paul Hoes
 2000: Jim van der Woude
 2001: Geert Lageveen and Frank Lammers
 2002: no nominations
 2003: Kees Boot
 2004: Pierre Bokma
 2005: Bob Schwarze
 2006: Jacob Derwig
 2007: Hein van der Heijden
 2008: Rudolf Lucieer
 2009: Benny Claessens
 2010: Stefan de Walle
 2011: Peter Bolhuis
 2012: Gijs Naber
 2013: Stefan de Walle
 2014: Martijn Nieuwerf
 2015: Vincent van der Valk
 2016: Risto Kübar
 2017: Maarten Heijmans
 2018: Vanja Rukavina
 2019: Mark Kraan
 2020: not awarded due to COVID19; with nominations
 2021: Jaap Spijkers
 2022: Majd Mardo

References

Awards established in 1964
Dutch awards
Theatre acting awards
1964 establishments in the Netherlands